Koji Asano (born 26 April 1974 in Saitama, Japan) is a Japanese musician and composer. He works primarily in the field of electro-acoustic music, with his principal instrument being computer software. Although he is essentially a solo performer, he has also appeared in numerous ensembles, such as Ensemble Die Reihe, Paragon Ensemble, Smith Quartet, Barcelona Winds Orchestra, and the Koji Asano Ensemble. Besides a prolific string of albums and limited-edition CD-Rs, he has also composed music for video art, films, and theatrical performances.

External links
Koji Asano's website
Interview at Disquiet website

1974 births
Electroacoustic music composers
Japanese composers
Japanese male composers
Japanese male musicians
Living people
Musicians from Saitama Prefecture
People from Saitama (city)